T.H.U.G.S. (Trues Humbly United Gatherin' Souls) is the debut solo studio album by American rapper Flesh-n-Bone from the hip hop group Bone Thugs-n-Harmony. It was released on November 19, 1996 via Rush Associated Labels. The album peeked at number 23 on the US Billboard 200, and on number 8 on the Top R&B/Hip Hop Albums. The album was certified gold by the RIAA for a total of 500,000 units/copies.

Track listing

Charts

Weekly charts

Year-end charts

Certifications

References

External links

1996 debut albums
Flesh-n-Bone albums
Def Jam Recordings albums
Albums produced by Rhythum D